Chelidura aptera is a species of earwig in the family Forficulidae. The distribution is restricted to the southwestern Alps.

References 

Forficulidae
Insects of Africa
Insects of Europe
Insects described in 1825